A subdivision of the Communist Party of Great Britain (CPGB), the Communist Party Historians Group (CPHG) formed a highly influential cluster of British Marxist historians, who contributed to "history from below" from 1946 to 1956. Famous members included such leading lights of 20th-century British historiography as Christopher Hill, Eric Hobsbawm, Raphael Samuel and E. P. Thompson, as well as non-academics like A. L. Morton and Brian Pearce.

In keeping with their standing positions, many of the members carried out their projects from adult education institutions, rather than the academy. In 1952 several of the members founded the influential social history journal Past and Present.

Aims and methods 

In their work we can read two definite aims:

 to seek out a popular revolutionary tradition that could inspire contemporary activists; and yet
 to apply a Marxist economic approach which placed an emphasis on social conditions rather than supposed "Great Men".

This dualism was represented by Marx and Engels' dictum that "men make their own history, but they do not do so in conditions of their own choosing", which is regularly paraphrased in CPHG members' texts.

Revisiting and reinstating popular agency in the narrative of British history required originality and determination in the research process, to draw out marginal voices from texts in which they were barely mentioned or active. The techniques influenced both feminist historians and the Subaltern Studies Group, writing the histories of marginalised groups.

1956 and after 

The group had been losing members during the Cold War, but lost many more prominent members due to events that shook the Global Communist movement in 1956. First was Khrushchev's Secret Speech, which stunned many diehards and led to discussions in parties around the world about the crimes of Stalin. Instead of this leading to loosening up of the system in the Eastern Bloc it helped trigger the Hungarian Uprising, the brutality of the Soviet invasion disgusted a great many party members who abandoned hope in peaceful reform. The year 1956 thus had several key factors that precipitated something of a sea change in international Marxist opinion. Many figures went on to become prominent in the New Left, especially Samuel, Saville and Thompson. Others stayed in the party, most notably Eric Hobsbawm, who remained in the group, which in 1956 launched a quarterly monograph series "Our History". As the CP History Group, it continued until the CPGB's dissolution at the end of 1991, and even managed to increase its membership and output of publications at a time when the CPGB itself was in terminal decline.

Socialist History Society
In early 1992 it reconstituted itself as the Socialist History Society (SHS), and made full membership available to anybody regardless of party affiliation. The SHS now publishes a twice-yearly journal Socialist History and a series of monographs called "Occasional Papers".

Notable members 
Maurice Dobb
Christopher Hill
Rodney Hilton
Charles Hobday
Eric Hobsbawm
Victor Kiernan
Stephen Finney Mason
A. L. Morton
George Rudé
Raphael Samuel
John Saville
Dorothy Thompson
E. P. Thompson
Dona Torr

Bibliography
Kaye, Harvey J., The British Marxist Historians: an introductory analysis, Cambridge: Polity Press, 1984.

External links
Socialist History Society
Selection of CPHG publications